A multilingual notation is a representation in a lexical resource that allows the translation between two or more words.

UML diagrams
For instance, within LMF, a multilingual notation could be as presented in the following diagram, for English / French translation. In this diagram, two intermediate SenseAxis instances are used in order to represent a near match between fleuve in French and river in English. The SenseAxis instance on the bottom is not linked directly to any English sense because this notion does not exist in English.

A more complex situation is when more than two languages are concerned, as in the following diagram dealing with English, Italian and Spanish.

Number of languages considerations
Within the context of a multilingual database comprising more than two languages, usually the multilingual notations are factorized, in order to save the number of links. In other terms, the multilingual notations are interlingual nodes that are shared among the language descriptions.

But in the specific context of a lexical resource that is a bilingual lexicon, the term bilingual link is usually preferred.

Other terminology
Let us note that instead of translation (that has a rather broad meaning), some authors prefer equivalence between words, with different notions like dynamic and formal equivalences.

Context of use
This term is mainly used in the context of Machine translation and NLP lexicons. The term is not used in the context of translation dictionary that concerns mainly hand-held electronic translators.

See also
lexical markup framework

External links
 workshop on multilingual language resources

Computational linguistics

Natural language processing